Floyd Franks (born April 5, 1984) is an American soccer player.

Career

College and Amateur
Franks attended Vestavia Hills High School and played four years of college soccer at the University of North Carolina at Charlotte, finishing his career with 18 goals and 15 assists in 71 matches. He two-time all-Conference USA selection after his sophomore and junior seasons and an all-Atlantic 10 Conference selection after his senior season.

During his college years Franks also played with Carolina Dynamo in the USL Premier Development League.

Professional
Franks was selected in the first round (10th overall) of the 2006 MLS Supplemental Draft by Chicago Fire; he scored his first career professional goal on July 29, 2007, against Toronto FC.

After being released by Chicago at the end of the 2007 season, Franks signed with Cleveland City Stars in April 2008, and spent a year playing in the USL Second Division before moving to Denmark to play with Blokhus in the Danish 2nd Division West. He played 33 games and scored 4 goals for the Danes before leaving in a blaze of glory at the end of the 2008/09 season. Floyd currently is up for election into the Alabama Sports Hall of Fame. Additionally, he was voted a rising star in "Dunavant Soccer" magazine, which described Franks as "an athlete, a tremendous competitor."

On February 15, 2010, the Carolina RailHawks announced that they had signed him for the 2010 season.

Franks was signed by Vancouver Whitecaps FC of Major League Soccer on March 6, 2012 and waived on June 28. He later returned to the RailHawks. On July 25, 2013, Midway through the 2012,  Franks was traded by the RailHawks to the Minnesota United FC.

References

External links
 

1984 births
Living people
American soccer players
American expatriate soccer players
Charlotte 49ers men's soccer players
North Carolina Fusion U23 players
Chicago Fire FC players
Cleveland City Stars players
Jammerbugt FC players
North Carolina FC players
Vancouver Whitecaps FC players
Minnesota United FC (2010–2016) players
Expatriate men's footballers in Denmark
Expatriate soccer players in Canada
Soccer players from Birmingham, Alabama
USL League Two players
Major League Soccer players
USL Second Division players
USSF Division 2 Professional League players
North American Soccer League players
Chicago Fire FC draft picks
People from Vestavia Hills, Alabama
Association football midfielders